The 2011 Cork Intermediate Hurling Championship was the 102nd staging of the Cork Intermediate Hurling Championship since its establishment by the Cork County Board in 1909. The draw for the opening round fixtures took place on 12 December 2010. The championship began on 27 May 2011 and ended on 2 October 2011.

On 2 October 2011, Bandon won the championship following a 2-14 to 0-07 defeat of Fr. O'Neill's in the final at Páirc Uí Chaoimh. This was their third championship title overall and their first title since 1974.

Bandon's Ronan Crowley was the championship's top scorer with 1-39.

Team changes

To Championship

Promoted from the Cork Junior A Hurling Championship
 Meelin

Relegated from the Cork Premier Intermediate Hurling Championship
 Fr. O'Neill's

From Championship

Promoted to the Cork Premier Intermediate Hurling Championship
 Kilbrittain

Relegated to the City Junior A Hurling Championship
 St. Vincent's

Results

First round

Second round

Third round

Relegation playoff

Fourth round

 Fr. O'Neill's and Ballygarvan received byes in this round.

Quarter-finals

Semi-finals

Final

Championship statistics

Top scorers

Overall

In a single game

References

Cork Intermediate Hurling Championship
Cork Intermediate Hurling Championship